The Rochester Knighthawks (also known as the K-Hawks) were a professional box lacrosse team in the National Lacrosse League. They played in Rochester, New York at the Blue Cross Arena at the War Memorial. The Knighthawks were previously members of the Major Indoor Lacrosse League from 1995 to 1997. They were members of the NLL since the league's inaugural 1998 season.

The Knighthawks reached the playoffs in each of their first 13 seasons, from 1995 to 2007. This is a league record going back to the league's original creation, the Eagle Pro Box Lacrosse League.  The previous record was 11 straight years, held by the Philadelphia Wings. They were also the first NLL team to win three consecutive championships (2012–14).

The new Knighthawks are owned by Pegula Sports and Entertainment who purchased the intellectual property of the team from former owner Curt Styres who moved the previous version of the team to Halifax, Nova Scotia as the Halifax Thunderbirds at the end of the 2018-2019 season. As an expansion team they are not a continuation of the previous Knighthawks. All records and championships were transferred to Halifax.

History 
The Rochester Knighthawks found success throughout their history despite playing in a small market.

In their inaugural season they finished 3rd during the regular season and dispatched the Boston Blazers in the playoff semifinals to get to the finals as an expansion team.  As they would do three times later on, they found themselves coming up just short in the championship game, falling in overtime to the Philadelphia Wings.

Just two seasons later, the Knighthawks would find their way to the top of the MILL heap, claiming the final North American Cup before the merger with the National Lacrosse League prior to the 1998 season.  It would be ten years before the Knighthawks claimed their second title. They beat the Arizona Sting in the 2007 Championship by a score of 13-11. In 2012, the Knighthawks defeated the Edmonton Rush for the Championship by a score of 9-6. In 2013, the Knighthawks became the first team in the league to clinch back-to-back championship titles since the Toronto Rock in 2002 and 2003 by defeating the Washington Stealth 11-10.  In 2014, the Knighthawks set a new league record by winning their third straight championship title.

2007 season 
After starting the season with a record of 2-2, the Knighthawks beat the Toronto Rock 19-15 in Toronto, where they had only won twice before in team history. The Knighthawks followed this victory up with 11 more, finishing the season with a franchise-record 12 regular-season-game winning streak and a 14-2 record. The Knighthawks were a perfect 8-0 at home, becoming the first team since the 2003 Bandits to post a perfect record at home. The winning streak was extended to 13 games after they defeated the Rock 10-6 in the division semi-finals; and to 14 after beating the Bandits in overtime, 14-13, for the East Division title. After the season, head coach Ed Comeau was named the 2007 Les Bartley Award winner.

Despite having the best overall record, they could not host the championship game due to a scheduling conflict with the Ringling Bros. and Barnum & Bailey Circus at the Blue Cross Arena.  Playing the game instead in Arizona, the Knighthawks defeated the Arizona Sting 13-11 on May 12, 2007, to win their first NLL championship. John Grant, Jr., regular-season league MVP, was named MVP of the game.

The winning streak continued during the 2008 season, as the Knighthawks defeated the Buffalo Bandits in the opening game on January 11, 2008.  However, the next night in Rochester, the streak was halted at 16 games as they were defeated by the Bandits 14-9.

Lease issue 
During the 2007 season, a dispute over concession revenues between owner Steve Donner and the Sports Management Group, then operators of the Blue Cross Arena, jeopardized the continued play of the Knighthawks in Rochester. Donner claimed that the Knighthawks and the Rochester Americans of the American Hockey League had lost over $500,000 the previous two seasons, and without concession revenue sharing, he would be unable to continue to operate the teams in Rochester. An agreement was reached between the Amerks/Knighthawks SMG, and the City of Rochester on a one-year lease extension on May 11, 2007 that would allow for long-term negotiations to continue through both teams' 2008 season. Under the extension, the Amerks/Knighthawks agreed to an independent audit of their finances and the city agreed to forgo additional luxury suite revenue from the arena and to loan the Amerks an additional $100,000, added on to a $500,000 loan that is now past-due. On June 16, 2008 the Knighthawks and Americans announced a new five-year lease with the Blue Cross Arena.

Curt Styres era 
On May 28, 2008 the National Lacrosse League's Board of Governors approved the sale of a majority stake of the Knighthawks to the President of Arrow Express Sports Curt Styres at a price of $5,575,000, the highest price paid for a team in league history. The league's approval was conditional upon whether or not the Knighthawks and Sports Management Group could secure a new lease for play at the Blue Cross Arena. Styres had also recently been approved by the American Hockey League to purchase the Americans. On June 16, 2008 the Knighthawks and Americans announced a new five-year lease with the Blue Cross Arena.

In June 2011, the Americans and Knighthawks were split up when Terrence Pegula purchased the Americans. The split was necessary at the time due to Pegula owning the Buffalo Bandits. This is a rule that would later be changed.

Original team relocation and replacement

On September 13, 2018, Styres announced that he would be accepting a new team in Halifax, Nova Scotia and would be relocating the Knighthawks to the city for the winter 2019–2020 season. The Knighthawks intellectual property was sold to Terry and Kim Pegula (the latter of whom was raised in the Rochester suburbs) along with an expansion franchise to ensure Rochester's uninterrupted presence in the league. The original name was used, but the color scheme and logo changed. The team logo, colors, and other officials were announced on May 29, 2019 in an event at Blue Cross Arena. The new franchise does not count as a continuation of the previous franchise. All championships and records were transferred to Halifax.

Awards and honors

NLL Hall of Fame members
 Gary Gait, 2009–2011 (class of 2006)
 Paul Gait, 1995–1997 (class of 2006)
 Steve Dietrich, 1995–2001 (class of 2012)
 Pat O'Toole 1999–2010 (class of 2013)

Final roster

All-time record

Playoff results

*The Knighthawks had the overall top seed in the playoffs, but were unable to host the Championship game due to a scheduling conflict at the Blue Cross Arena.

Head coaching history

Draft history

NLL Entry Draft
First Round Selections

 1994: Cam Bomberry (1st overall)
 1995: Derek Collins (5th overall)
 1996: Cory Bomberry (3rd overall)
 1997: None
 1998: Casey Powell (1st overall) & Brad MacArthur (5th overall)
 1999: John Grant (1st overall) & Ben Hunt (9th overall)
 2000: Lindsay Plunkett (8th overall)
 2001: Teddy Jenner (11th overall)
 2002: Pete Benedict (11th overall)
 2003: Scott Evans (5th overall)
 2004: Mike Morrison (8th overall)
 2005: Shawn Evans (2nd overall)
 2006: Jack Reid (10th overall)
 2007: Matt McLeod (8th overall) & Andrew Potter (14th overall)
 2008: None
 2009: Sid Smith (1st overall)
 2010: Cody Jamieson (1st overall)
 2011: Stephen Keogh (2nd overall), Johnny Powless (5th overall)
 2012: Carson Michaud (56th overall)
 2013: None
 2014: Jeremy Noble (2nd overall)
 2015: Graeme Hossack (2nd overall), Brad Gillies (9th overall)

NLL Dispersal Draft

2002 from Montreal Express: Steve Penny (10th overall); Declined to pick (22nd overall)
2003 from Ottawa Rebel: Mat Giles (10th overall); Shawn Zettel (21st overall); Declined to pick (32nd overall)
2004 from Vancouver Ravens: Chris McKay (5th overall); Peter Morgan (14th overall)
2005 from Anaheim Storm: Cam Bergman (8th overall)
2007 from Arizona Sting & Boston Blazers: Jack Reid, Boston (12th overall); Matt Lyons, Arizona (13th overall); Alex Smith, Arizona (36th overall)
2008 from Arizona Sting: Lindsay Plunkett (5th overall); Matt Brown (18th overall)
2008 from Chicago Shamrox: Mike Kirk (4th overall); Bobby McBride (16th overall); Craig Robertson (24th overall); Pat Saunders (25th overall); Brock Boyle (26th overall)
2009 from Arizona Sting: Dan Stroup (17th overall)
2010 from Orlando Titans: Jordan Hall (3rd overall); Dan Hardy (13th overall); Kenny Nims (23rd overall); Mike Evans (33rd overall); Bobby Horsey (40th overall)
2011 from Boston Blazers: Mike Kirk (5th overall), Casey Powell (14th overall), Jack Reid (23rd overall)

NLL Expansion Draft

1999 to Albany Attack: Josh Sanderson (2nd overall)
2001 to Calgary Roughnecks, New Jersey Storm, Vancouver Ravens & Columbus Landsharks: Randy Mearns, Calgary (8th overall); Marc Landriault, Calgary (14th overall); Lindsay Plunkett, Vancouver (16th overall); Kevin Howard, Calgary (30th overall)
2004 to Minnesota Swarm: Jon Harasym (N/A overall)
2005 to Portland Lumberjax & Edmonton Rush: Pat Campbell, Edmonton (8th overall); Mat Giles, Portland (9th overall)
2006 to Chicago Shamrox & New York Titans: Carter Livingstone, Chicago (17th overall); Ryan O'Connor, Chicago (19th overall)
2007 to Boston Blazers: Brian Croswell (13th overall)
2008 to Boston Blazers: Matt Lyons (3rd overall)

See also
 Rochester Knighthawks seasons

References

 
Knighthawks
Lacrosse clubs established in 1995
Lacrosse clubs disestablished in 2019
Lacrosse teams in New York (state)
Major Indoor Lacrosse League teams
Defunct National Lacrosse League teams
1995 establishments in New York (state)
2019 disestablishments in New York (state)